The Latvia men's national basketball team represents Latvia in international basketball. They are organized and run by the Latvian Basketball Association. Latvia has reached the European Basketball Championship 15 times, with their ultimate success occurring during the inter-war period, when they became the first team to win the tournament in 1935. Four years later, they had another impressive run to come away with the silver in 1939. Although after 1939, Latvia were forced to suspend their national team operations, due to the Occupation of the Baltic states during World War II. Latvia regained independence in 1991, with their national team taking part in international competition once again a year later.

History

Origins of the team
On 26 November 1923, the Latvijas Basketbola Savienība was founded, earlier than most basketball federations from other countries.

On 29 April 1924, Latvia played their first international game versus Estonia, winning it 20–16.

In the winter of 1924, the first men's basketball championship was held, while the first women's championship was organized in 1933.

Latvians, like their Baltic neighbors Lithuanians and Estonians, also began playing basketball in the 1920s, quickly rising as the strongest of the Baltic teams. On 13 December 1925 in Riga, when the Lithuanian national team played their first international game. Latvia easily swept them with the score of 41–20. Later on, Latvia continued to dominate the future three-times European champions as well (41–29 and 123–10). In fact, Latvia had one of the world's strongest national basketball teams. The first Latvian teams consisted of students and pupils, who were trained by coaches of the American YMCA (Young Men's Christian Association).

Latvia also was one of the eight countries which signed the founding act of FIBA on 18 June 1932 in Geneva, along with Switzerland, Czechoslovakia, Greece, Italy, Portugal, Romania and Argentina. The Latvian representative in this event was Jāzeps Šadeiko.

EuroBasket 1935

The Latvians won the first European basketball championship, the EuroBasket 1935 held by the International Basketball Federation's FIBA Europe continental federation. They defeated Hungary in the preliminary round, Switzerland in the semi-finals, and Spain in the final to finish at the top of the ten-nation field.

Latvia held their opponents to 49 points over three games, the lowest points-against average in the tournament. Their scoring rate, 98 points over three games for 32.67 points per game, was second only to France.

Latvia is the smallest country in population to ever win the EuroBasket.

In 2012, Latvian film director Aigars Grauba directed the historical sports drama Dream Team 1935 about the journey of the Latvian team towards winning the title.

1936 Summer Olympic Games (Berlin 1936)

The Latvia national basketball team participated in the first appearance of basketball as an official Olympic medal event. Latvia were reigning European champions and were considered to be one of the pre-tournament favorites. Although the Olympics did not go that well for the Latvians. They began the tournament with a 20–17 victory over Uruguay. However, they were soundly beaten 23–34 by Canada and after suffering another defeat to Poland 23–28, the Latvians did not qualify for the knockout stage, unlike their neighbors Estonia. This was the first and only appearance for Latvia at the Olympic Games as of 2019 (their female counterparts made their first appearance in 2008).

EuroBasket 1937

At the EuroBasket 1937, the reigning champions got off to a great start in their first game in the tournament by blowing out Czechoslovakia 44-11. In their second game they lost a close one to Poland to drop to (1-1) in the standings. They finished up group play with a needed win against France to put them in a three-way tie for the lead of the four-team group. However, it wouldn't be enough for the national team to reach the semi-finals as they came out on the bottom of the tie-breaker against Poland and France. This result came about despite the Latvians being the highest-scoring team in the entire tournament and allowing fewer opponent points than any of the other teams in their group.

Being in the bottom half of the preliminary group meant that the team could finish no better than fifth.  In the classification semifinal, Latvia faced Egypt, which had withdrawn after their first two preliminary matches. They advanced to the 5th/6th place playoff, which they lost to Estonia 41–19.

EuroBasket 1939

In 1939, despite losing twice, including a rematch of the 1937 game against Estonia, Latvia secured silver medals with 5 wins. Poland, which also had a 5-2 record, finished third as Latvia had won the match between the two teams. The tournament's opening and, in retrospect, decisive game between Latvia and Lithuania ended in a dramatic late victory for the hosts and eventual champions Lithuania, souring the sports relations between the two countries and leading to the cancellation of the 1939 Baltic Cup.

One of the 1939's vice-champions, Alfrēds Krauklis, once said: "Frankly saying – these three Baltic states raised the European basketball. Now they say that its Spanish, and so what? Let them say... And I say – it's our merit!".

Soviet and Nazi period (1940–1991)
Due to Soviet and Nazi occupations, Latvians were unable to represent Latvia in FIBA organized tournaments or the Olympic Games. Instead, they were forced to play for the Soviet Union national team.

Horrific times in Latvia began. In 1940 the massive people deportations started, implemented by the Soviets. Thousands of Latvians were forced to leave their homeland, thousands of them died due to the active warfare during World War II.

Though, despite all the cruel challenges, basketball was continued to be played and retained its popularity in Latvia. In 1941 a Baltic States tournament was organized in Kaunas Sports Hall. The Lithuanian SSR team won the final against the Latvian SSR, 38–33.

At the 1952 Summer Olympics, Maigonis Valdmanis became the first Latvian representative on the Soviet squad, which won the Olympic silver medals that year. A few years later two other Latvian basketball stars joined the team: Jānis Krūmiņš and Valdis Muižnieks. Later on, the trio won two EuroBasket titles and two times became Olympic vice-champions together.

In the 1950s, Rīgas ASK, coached by the Soviet legend Aleksandr Gomelsky, became the major force of the Soviet Union and even Europe by winning three consecutive European Cup titles from 1958 to 1960. The club's roster had multiple European champions in Jānis Krūmiņš, Maigonis Valdmanis and Valdis Muižnieks. Furthermore, in 1960 TTT Riga won the European Cup for Women's Clubs, undoubtedly turning Riga into the capital of basketball with the two major European basketball titles held by the single city's clubs at the same time. And it only was the first of the stunning 18 European titles.

In later years other Latvian basketball stars appeared, such as Valdis Valters and Igors Miglinieks, both of whom were eventually crowned as Olympic champions. Valdis Valters is considered to be one of Europe's greatest basketball players of the 1980s. In addition to his Olympic title, he also won the World Cup in 1982 and became the European champion twice, being named as the MVP of EuroBasket 1981.

After the restoration of independence (from 1991)
On 4 May 1990 Latvia declared the country's independence from the Soviet Union. Consequently, in September 1991 its basketball federation was re-affiliated with FIBA. Though, despite having some remarkable players like Valdis Valters, Igors Miglinieks, Ainars Bagatskis, Kaspars Kambala, Andris Biedriņš, Latvia failed to recover its inter-war glory. Their best result after restoring the country's independence is the 5th place achieved at EuroBasket 2017. Although, basketball is slowly regaining its power in Latvia with the help of the medals-winning youth squads.

EuroBasket 2013

During EuroBasket 2013, Latvia began their tournament run with two wins against Bosnia and Herzegovina, and Montenegro before facing longtime Baltic rival Lithuania. Although in the highly anticipated match between the two nations, Lithuania prevailed 67-59. Latvia then lost their next match versus Serbia, but rebounded to win their final fixture in group play against Macedonia to advance.

In the second group phase of the tournament Latvia displayed immediate dominance in their first game of group play over Ukraine winning 86-51. It turned out to be the only win Latvia would record in the group, as they were eventually eliminated.

EuroBasket 2015

As one of the hosts for EuroBasket 2015 in Riga, Latvia began their campaign at the tournament victorious over Belgium 78-67. In their second match, they were once again pitted against their rivals Lithuania. Latvia looked to avenge their lost from the prior EuroBasket showdown between the two, as the national team got off to a strong start in the 1st quarter. Unfortunately, the Latvians were unable to maintain the momentum they started the match with, as they fell to their rivals again, 68-49. While it was demoralizing for Latvia to be defeated in that manner in front of their home crowd, they recovered quickly to win two out of the next three matches they played to move on to the knockout stage. There, Latvia beat Slovenia to advance to the quarter-finals, but ultimately fell short to the eventual bronze medalist France.

EuroBasket 2017

At EuroBasket 2017, Latvia entered the competition with high expectations, as they fielded one of their most potent lineups ever. With the addition of Latvian star Kristaps Porziņģis joining the senior national team for the first time, Latvia was poised to go on a long tournament run. But in their first match they were out lasted by a veteran Serbian squad, 92-82. Although, the national team bounced back in a huge way dismantling Belgium 92-64, with Porziņģis and Jānis Timma leading the way in scoring with 27 points apiece. They also went on to win their next three matches in group play to finish with a (4-1) record, to earn a spot in the knockout rounds. In their round of 16 match up, they throttled Montenegro 100-68. Latvia ran into an buzz saw in their quarter-finals match though, falling to the eventual champions Slovenia.
 
Latvia finished fifth in the tournament overall, reaching their best post-war result in the history of the national team, in which Kristaps Porziņģis debuted with astonishing averages of 23.6 points, 5.9 rebounds and 1.9 blocks at the age of 22.

Recent years
On 1 August 2019, Latvia named former player Roberts Štelmahers the new head coach of the national team. He replaced Arnis Vecvagars. In November 2022, Latvia clinched qualification to the 2023 FIBA World Cup, making it the first time the team will appear at the World Cup finals.

Competitive record

FIBA World Cup

Olympic Games

EuroBasket

Results and fixtures

2021

2022

2023

Team

Current roster
Roster for the 2023 FIBA World Cup Qualifiers matches on 24 and 27 February 2023 against Turkey and Greece.

Depth chart

Notable players
Current notable players from Latvia who have played for the national team:

Head coach history

Notable players
Retired players:
Andris Biedriņš – was the highest ever NBA drafted Latvian basketball player until 2015. In the 2004 NBA Draft, the Golden State Warriors selected him #11. Only Kristaps Porzingis has been drafted higher.
Kaspars Kambala – one of the best 2000s Latvian basketball players.
Sandis Valters – also one of the best 2000s Latvian basketball players.
Ainars Bagatskis – long-term national team's member. Current team's coach.
Igors Miglinieks – Olympic champion with the Soviet Union squad.
Valdis Valters – World champion. Valters returned to the court after his first retirement and represented the Latvia national team in the Qualifying tournament of the 1992 Olympics.
Alfreds Krauklis – one of the key players in 1939.
 Karlis Arents – one of the key players in 1939.
Visvaldis Melderis – team's third leading scorer in 1939.
 Voldemārs Šmits – team's second leading scorer in 1937 and 1939.
Rūdolfs Jurciņš  – national team's leading scorer in 1935, tournament's leading scorer in 1937.

Past rosters
1935 EuroBasket: finished 1st  among 10 teams

3 Eduards Andersons, 4 Aleksejs Anufrijevs, 5 Mārtiņš Grundmanis, 6 Herberts Gubiņš, 8 Rūdolfs Jurciņš, 9 Jānis Lidmanis, 10 Visvaldis Melderis, 11 Džems Raudziņš (Coach: Valdemārs Baumanis)

1936 Olympic Games: finished 18th among 21 teams

1 Rūdolfs Jurciņš, 2 Visvaldis Melderis, 3 Eduards Andersons, 4 Džems Raudziņš, 5 Voldemārs Elmūts, 6 Mārtiņš Grundmanis, 7 Maksis Kazaks (Coach: Valdemārs Baumanis)

1937 EuroBasket: finished 6th among 8 teams

3 Eduards Andersons, 4 Aleksejs Anufrijevs, 5 Mārtiņš Grundmanis, 6 Janis Jansons, 7 Rūdolfs Jurciņš, 8 Andrejs Krisons, 9 Aleksandrs Martinsons, 10 Visvaldis Melderis, 11 Džems Raudziņš, 12 Voldemārs Šmits (Coach: Ādolfs Grasis)

1939 EuroBasket: finished 2nd  among 8 teams

3 Aleksandrs Vanags, 4 Alfrēds Krauklis, 5 Teodors Grinbergs, 6 Maksis Kazaks, 8 Voldemārs Šmits, 9 Jānis Graudiņš, 11 Karlis Arents, 12 Juris Solovjovs, 14 Karlis Satins, 18 Visvaldis Melderis (Coach: Valdemārs Baumanis)

1993 EuroBasket: finished 9th among 16 teams

4 Edgars Šneps, 5 Jānis Āzacis, 6 Igors Meļņiks, 7 Kārlis Muižnieks, 8 Ivars Zankovskis, 9 Ainars Bagatskis, 10 Dzintars Jaunzems, 11 Ivars Liepa, 12 Raimonds Miglinieks, 13 Edmunds Valeiko, 14 Andrejs Bondarenko, 15 Aigars Zeidaks  (Coach: Armands Krauliņš)

1997 EuroBasket: finished 16th among 16 teams

4 Uvis Helmanis, 5 Jānis Āzacis, 6 Edmunds Valeiko, 7 Roberts Štelmahers, 8 Kārlis Muižnieks, 9 Edgars Šneps, 10 Raimonds Miglinieks, 11 Ainars Bagatskis, 12 Ivars Liepa, 13 Ralfs Jansons, 14 Andrejs Bondarenko, 15 Igors Meļņiks (Coach: Igors Miglinieks)

2001 EuroBasket: finished 8th among 16 teams

4 Uvis Helmanis, 5 Aigars Vītols, 6 Kaspars Cipruss, 7 Roberts Štelmahers, 8 Edmunds Valeiko, 9 Māris Ļaksa, 10 Kristaps Valters, 11 Raimonds Miglinieks, 12 Ainars Bagatskis, 13 Raitis Grafs, 14 Kaspars Kambala, 15 Arnis Vecvagars (Coach: Armands Krauliņš)

2003 EuroBasket: finished 13th among 16 teams

4 Uvis Helmanis, 5 Aigars Vītols, 6 Trojs Ostlers, 7 Roberts Štelmahers, 8 Armands Šķēle, 9 Edgars Šneps, 10 Kristaps Valters, 11 Māris Ļaksa, 12 Ainars Bagatskis, 13 Raitis Grafs, 14 Kaspars Kambala, 15 Arnis Vecvagars (Coach: Armands Krauliņš)

2005 EuroBasket: finished 14th among 16 teams

4 Uvis Helmanis, 5 Aigars Vītols, 6 Armands Šķēle, 7 Roberts Štelmahers, 8 Jānis Blūms, 9 Sandis Valters, 10 Kristaps Valters, 11 Ivars Timermanis, 12 Mārtiņš Skirmants, 13 Raitis Grafs, 14 Kaspars Cipruss, 15 Kristaps Janičenoks (Coach: Kārlis Muižnieks)

2007 EuroBasket: finished 13th among 16 teams

4 Uvis Helmanis, 5 Aigars Vītols, 6 Armands Šķēle, 7 Jānis Blūms, 8 Raimonds Vaikulis, 9 Gatis Jahovičs, 10 Sandis Valters, 11 Pāvels Veselovs, 12 Kaspars Cipruss, 13 Raitis Grafs, 14 Kristaps Janičenoks, 15 Andris Biedriņš (Coach: Kārlis Muižnieks)

2009 EuroBasket: finished 13th among 16 teams

4 Uvis Helmanis, 5 Aigars Vītols, 6 Armands Šķēle, 7 Jānis Blūms, 8 Ernests Kalve, 9 Kristaps Valters, 10 Gatis Jahovičs, 11 Kaspars Kambala, 12 Rolands Freimanis, 13 Artūrs Štālbergs, 14 Kristaps Janičenoks, 15 Andris Biedriņš (Coach: Kęstutis Kemzūra)

2011 EuroBasket: finished 21st among 24 teams

4 Mārtiņš Meiers, 5 Dairis Bertāns, 6 Rolands Freimanis, 7 Jānis Blūms, 8 Mareks Jurevičus, 9 Edgars Jeromanovs, 10 Rihards Kuksiks, 11 Mareks Mejeris, 12 Dāvis Bertāns, 13 Jānis Strēlnieks, 14 Artūrs Bērziņš, 15 Andrejs Šeļakovs (Coach: Ainars Bagatskis)

2013 EuroBasket: finished 11th among 24 teams

4 Mārtiņš Meiers, 5 Mareks Mejeris, 6 Rolands Freimanis, 7 Jānis Blūms, 8 Jānis Bērziņš, 9 Dairis Bertāns, 10 Rihards Kuksiks, 11 Armands Šķēle, 12 Kristaps Janičenoks, 13 Jānis Strēlnieks, 14 Kaspars Bērziņš, 15 Andrejs Šeļakovs (Coach: Ainars Bagatskis)

2015 EuroBasket: finished 8th among 24 teams

5 Mareks Mejeris, 6 Rolands Freimanis, 7 Jānis Blūms (C), 9 Dairis Bertāns, 10 Jānis Timma, 12 Kristaps Janičenoks, 13 Jānis Strēlnieks, 14 Kaspars Bērziņš, 19 Kaspars Vecvagars, 23 Haralds Kārlis, 31 Žanis Peiners, 33 Mārtiņš Meiers (Coach: Ainars Bagatskis)

2017 EuroBasket: finished 5th among 24 teams

6 Kristaps Porziņģis, 7 Jānis Blūms (C), 8 Dāvis Bertāns, 9 Dairis Bertāns, 10 Jānis Timma, 11 Rolands Šmits, 12 Kristaps Janičenoks, 13 Jānis Strēlnieks, 21 Aigars Šķēle, 24 Andrejs Gražulis, 31 Žanis Peiners, 33 Mārtiņš Meiers (Coach: Ainars Bagatskis)

Statistics

Record against other teams
*Friendly matches not counted

See also

Sport in Latvia
Latvia men's national under-20 basketball team
Latvia men's national under-19 basketball team
Latvia men's national under-17 basketball team

Notes

References

External links

Official website 
Latvia FIBA profile
Latvia National Team – Men at Eurobasket.com
Latvia Basketball Records at FIBA Archive

Men's national basketball teams
 
National sports teams of Latvia
FIBA EuroBasket-winning countries